Kronberg im Taunus is a town in the Hochtaunuskreis district, Hesse, Germany and part of the Frankfurt Rhein-Main urban area. Before 1866, it was in the Duchy of Nassau; in that year the whole Duchy was absorbed into Prussia. Kronberg lies at the foot of the Taunus, flanked in the north and southwest by forests. A mineral water spring also rises in the town.

Geography

Neighbouring communities

Kronberg borders in the north and east on the town of Oberursel, in the southeast on the town of Steinbach, in the south on the towns of Eschborn and Schwalbach (both in Main-Taunus-Kreis), and in the west on the town of Königstein.

Constituent communities
Kronberg consists of the three centres of Kronberg (8,108 inhabitants), Oberhöchstadt (6,363 inhabitants) and Schönberg (3,761 inhabitants).

History

1220–1704 

When Kronberg Castle was built (about 1220) it was shared by the Knights of Askenburne (Eschborn), who owned a towered castle there. The Kronenstamm (stamm = stem) moved to Kronberg, giving themselves that name at the time, while the Flügelstamm ("wing stem") followed them there only 30 years later.

Town rights were granted the small settlement on 25 April 1330 by Louis IV, Holy Roman Emperor. As of 1367, the town also had market rights as well as Blutgerichtsbarkeit (meaning that there was an Imperial court authorized to mete out bodily punishment, including death), granted by Charles IV, Holy Roman Emperor. Together with those from Hattstein Castle and Reifenberg Castle, the Knights of Kronberg from Frankfurt declared the so-called "Kronberg Feud" in 1389. When on 13 May a great force from Frankfurt swept to Kronberg Castle, Hanau (Ulrich von Hanau) and the Electorate of the Palatinate (150 of Ruprecht von der Pfalz's cuirassiers) troops rushed to help those being beset, driving the Frankfurt forces off on 14 May in the Battle of Eschborn and taking 620 prisoners, among them the mayor, a few noble council members and all the town's bakers, butchers, locksmiths and shoemakers.

The story is told in Kronberg that during the battle one of the knights of Kronberg was unhorsed, and because he lacked a replacement mount, he returned to battle on a donkey. Legend has it that it was the unearthly noise the donkey made in battle that made the Frankfurt army run, and this gave birth to the third "Stem", the Ohrenstam (Earstem) - with a pair of donkeys ears on its coat of arms.

Only the huge ransom of 73,000 golden guilders – negotiated on 22 August, the pain of which Frankfurt would feel for 120 years – ended the fight with Frankfurt and laid the groundwork for the Frankfurter Landwehr fortifications. Peace was, however, quickly concluded (1391) and alliance sought with Kronberg. In 1394, the council appointed Hartmuth von Cronberg to a two-year term as Bailiff of Bonames, and in 1395, Johann von Cronberg concluded a detailed treaty of federation with Frankfurt, which the Kronbergers bound the Frankfurters and their masses to protect. Finally, in 1398, the "Schießgesellen zu Cronenberg" ("Journeymen shooters of Kronberg") invited the "Schießgesellen zue Franckenfurd unsern guten frunden" ("Journeymen shooters of Frankfurt, our good friends") to a "Schießen umb eyn Cleynod" ("shoot for a treasure"). The letter bearing this message is said to be Germany's oldest surviving invitation to a shooting event (this refers to early weapons, since firearms were as yet unknown).

Since Hartmut XII of Kronberg, who is said to be the town's Reformer, had earlier stood by his cousin Franz von Sickingen in his attack on Trier and Worms, Archbishop Richard von Greiffenklau zu Vollrads of Trier, Ludwig V of the Electorate of the Palatinate and Philip I, Landgrave of Hesse attacked the town and the castle at Kronberg in 1522 and forced an unconditional surrender. Hartmut fled, and Philip introduced the Reformation throughout Hesse. However, since Kronberg was an Imperial fief, Philip had to give the castle and town back to Hartmut in 1541 under the issuing of property rights for the Lutheran Church. These rights were affirmed by Hesse-Darmstadt in the 17th and 18th centuries, ensuring that Mainz's later attempts at a Counterreformation (1626–1649) and the Simultanisierung (1737–1768) would never enjoy success.

In 1704, the last member of the ruling family, Herr Johann Niclas von und zu Cronberg, died childless at Hohlenfels Castle, nowadays in Hahnstätten, across the Aar Valley. Kronberg, along with the communities of Schönberg, Niederhöchstadt and Eschborn therefore passed to the Electorate of Mainz.

1704–1866 
It was under Mainz's rule that the nowadays so-called "Dispute Church" ("Streitkirche") was built, having been planned as a Catholic church in 1758 to be built right next to the Evangelical church. This led to great protests by the town's Evangelical majority, whose plight reached the Eternal Imperial Diet (Immerwährender Reichstag) in Regensburg, where the Evangelicals were granted their wish, and although the building was built anyway, it was never consecrated as a church. Since 1768, the building has served secular purposes (as a pharmacy, guesthouse, and today as the Kronberg Painters' Colony's museum).

In the Treaty of Lunéville in 1801, the Electorate of Mainz lost its worldly territory, including the Imperial fief of Kronberg, which was confiscated by the Prince of Nassau-Usingen in 1802, and formally awarded to him in 1803. In the Austro-Prussian War of 1866, the Duke of Nassau sided with Austria, thereby losing his land to Prussia.

1866–1945 

Wealthy industrialists, traders and bankers discovered the little Taunus town's idyllic and climatically advantageous setting right near Frankfurt in the middle of the 19th century and built villas and summer homes in Kronberg and Schönberg. Even artists, among them Anton Burger and Jakob Fürchtegott Dielmann, came to Kronberg and founded the Kronberg Painters' Colony, which lasted into the 20th century. Some of the Kronberg painters' works are on display in the museum at the "Dispute Church". The small town, for so long shaped by smallholders and craftsmen reached in its "Prussian epoch" its first upswing with the building of the Kronberg-Rödelheim railway (1874) and the luxurious Schloss Friedrichshof (1889–94) often called "Kronberg", the residence of Princess Victoria, eldest daughter of Queen Victoria and German Dowager Empress.

Since 1945 
After the Second World War, Kronberg belonged to Gross-Hessen ("Greater Hesse" – a provisional name for the state that was later dropped), and remains in Hesse today.

In 1946, the Papal Mission for Displaced Persons in Germany was moved to Kronberg by Pope Pius XII. The apostolic visitor and leader of the institution was the Bishop of Fargo, North Dakota, USA Aloisius Muench, who was of German heritage. His spiritual guidance mandate included caring for those who had fled or been driven out of Eastern Europe. Until the summer of 1949, he organized from Kronberg the transport of about 950 goods wagons full of Papal aid supplies to Germany. He was also supported by the US Government; before taking his position in Kronberg, he received from US Secretary of War Robert P. Patterson the document of appointment as liaison commissioner for religious affairs to the US military government in Germany. Through his contacts in the USA Muench arranged a formidable flow of donations into destruction-stricken Germany. After the Federal Republic of Germany was founded, the Kronberg Apostolic Mission was dissolved in 1951. Muench afterwards became the first Apostolic Nuncio in the Federal Republic of Germany (West Germany). In 1959, Pope John XXIII made Archbishop Muench a Cardinal.

Since 28 June 1966, Kronberg has been a state-recognized spa town.

As part of Hesse's municipal reforms, on 1 April 1972, Kronberg merged with the formerly independent communities of Oberhöchstadt and Schönberg.

Main sights
Old Town with Kronberg Castle, or Burg Kronberg, with its keep, which is the town's oldest building
the Schloss Friedrichshof (a stately home built as a widow's residence for "Empress Frederick" and now home to the Schlosshotel Kronberg)
the Recepturhof, Mainz Electorate's administration building
the town park
Saint John's Evangelical Church (Kirche St. Johann, 1440)
the "Streitkirche" ("Dispute Church", 1758)
"Hellhof", a noble seat built by the Kronberg Knights (first mentioned in 1424), nowadays partially converted into a gallery.
 Opelzoo, a medium-sized animal park between Kronberg and Königstein. The Opelzoo originally came into being from Opel Works founder Georg von Opel's grandson's private animal reserve. About 1956, the younger Opel brought a pair of endangered Persian fallow deer to Kronberg and through breeding ensured their survival.

Museums and galleries

 Museum at Kronberg Castle
 Kronberg Painters' Colony Museum at the Streitkirche
 Fritz-Best-Museum
 Braun-Museum
 Galerie Opper at the Streitkirche
 Galerie Hellhof
 Galerie Hana
 Galerie Sties
 Galerie Satyra
 ArtXchange

Politics

Distribution of town council seats

The municipal elections on 26 March 2006 yielded the following results:
 CDU  12 seats
 SPD   7 seats
 UBG 4 seats
 KfB 4 seats
 Greens 3 seats
 FDP   2 seats
 independent 1 seat

Culture

Festivals
The biggest street festival in the Old Town (around Steinstraße) is the Thäler Kerb. Since 1967, when the Thäler Kerbe club was founded, it has been and is still celebrated, always on Tuesday and Wednesday after the first Sunday in July (although in 2006, it was postponed until 11–12 July owing to the World Cup). During the two festival days, the Thäler Pärchen – the "king" and "queen" of the festival – Miss Bembel and the Thäler Bürgermeister, rule.

Other festivals
 Dallesfest in Oberhöchstadt
 Brunnenfest (spring festival) in Schönberg (2nd Saturday in August)
 Oberhöchstädter Kerb
 Kürbis-Festival (Gourd Festival) at Kronberg Castle (October)
 Linsenhoff UNICEF Foundation Schafhof Festival (irregular, next festival in 2007)

Markets
 Flea market in the Old Town (first Sunday in July)
 Bilder- und Weinmarkt (Picture and Wine Market; first weekend in August)
 Herbstmarkt ("Autumn Market, federation of independents, 2nd weekend in September)
 Apfelmarkt ("Apple Market"; October)
 Christmas Markets in Kronberg and Oberhöchstadt

Music festivals
Internationally known Kronberg Academy Cello Festival
Article in The Local about the festival

Transport
Kronberg is the terminus of the S-Bahn line S4, successor to the Kronberg Railway, which connects Kronberg with Frankfurt city center, the main train station and the neighboring city of Eschborn. The S-Bahn is part of the Rhein-Main-Verkehrsverbund.

For this purpose exists in Kronberg since 2001, a city bus network of three routes. Like the S-Bahn, it is integrated into the Rhein-Main-Verkehrsverbund and carries around 380,000 people a year. The offer is complemented by a call-collecting taxi, which covers some geographical gaps of the city bus and serves for operating hour extension. In addition, regional bus lines connect Kronberg with the neighboring cities and the nearby Frankfurt Northwest Center.

The first years of operation of the Kronberg city bus were characterized by controversial political discussions, not only in the city council, but also within the population. This was due to initial planning errors that initially reduced the acceptance of the offer, as well as changing political majorities. Although the city bus has meanwhile (2011) established itself in a positive sense, are now due to the poor budgetary situation again cuts in urban transport offer in the middle.

Since early 2013, the Frankfurt Department of Transportation has a possible extension of the subway line 6 to Eschborn examine, which ends at the Heerstraße in Frankfurt-Praunheim. The Frankfurt Department of Transportation has commissioned a correspondingly concrete study of the project. A stop in the industrial park Helfmann-Park is possible. This would, according to the mayor of Eschborn "further enhance the location Eschborn". An exact timetable for the project does not exist yet. In the foreseeable future, there will be a meeting with representatives from Eschborn, Frankfurt and Oberursel on the subway theme. The Greens in the Hochtaunuskreis have recently advocated upgrading the U6 via Eschborn with stops in Steinbach and Kronberg. The city of Oberursel in the high tunnel circle was long ago connected via the U3 to the Frankfurt subway network.

Economy and infrastructure
Kronberg is home to the national headquarters of a number of international firms, such as Accenture, Braun GmbH (Gillette), Celanese and Fidelity International.

Agriculturally, Kronberg is known best of all for its sweet chestnuts and strawberry fields; there are also a few Streuobstwiesen, meadows that also support a variety of different fruit trees. There are Mineral springs in the Kronthal.

Education

 Kronthal-Schule (primary school) Kronberg, formerly Grundschule Kronberg, in the former building of the Altkönigschule
 Viktoria-Schule (primary school) Schönberg
 Schöne Aussicht (primary school) Oberhöchstadt
 Altkönigschule  (secondary school, comprehensive school with gymnasial upper level) in Kronberg's main town, until 1973/74 in the Villa Winter
 Montessori School (Schönberg)
 Religionspädagogisches Studienzentrum der Evangelischen Kirche in Hessen und Nassau (Schönberg)
 DRK School of Elderly Care (Kronberg)
 Waldkindergarten Kronberg - Related article in The Local

Notable people
 Eberwin II (died 1308), from 1300 Bishop of Worms
 Johannes von Cronberg (?-?) about 1300, Choir Bishop at Strasbourg
 Walter von Cronberg (1477–1543) High Master of the Teutonic Knights
 Hartmut XII (1488–1549) early companion of Martin Luther, editor of many "Reformational" writings
 Johann Schweikhard von Kronberg (1553–1626) from 1604 Elector and Archbishop at Mainz, builder of the Schloss Johannisburg in Aschaffenburg
 Johann Daniel von Cronberg (c. 1616-1668) member of the "Fruitbearing Society"
 Alwara Höfels (born 6 April 1982) German stage and screen actress was born there.

Residents
 Hermann Abs (1901–1994) German banker
 Josef Ackermann (1948- ), Deutsche Bank Chairman of the Board.
 Fritz Best (1894–1980) painter and sculptor
 Johann Ludwig Christ (1739–1813) Evangelical clergyman, pomologist
 Jakob Fürchtegott Dielmann (1809–1885) founder of the Kronberg Painters' colony
 Joachim Fest (1926–2006) German historian
 Empress Frederick (1840–1901) Frederick III's widow, Queen Victoria's eldest daughter
 Carl-Hans Graf von Hardenberg (1891–1958) politician and participant in the 20 July Plot, lived from 1945 until his death in 1958 in Kronberg
 Max Horkheimer (1895–1973) lived for a time, until Hitler seized power, on Minnholzweg
 Walther Leisler Kiep (1926-2016) CDU politician
 Ann-Kathrin Linsenhoff (1960- ) German dressage rider, founder of the Linsenhoff UNICEF foundation
 Liselott Linsenhoff (1927–1999) German dressage rider, multiple Olympic champion, VDO founder Adolf Schindling's daughter.
 Hans Matthöfer (1925-2009) SPD politician
 Wolfgang Mischnick (1921–2002) FDP politician
 Maria Mucke (1919-2018) singer and television entertainer
 Karl Otto Pöhl (1929-2014) president of the Deutsche Bundesbank 1980-1991
 Fritz Schilgen (1906–2005) last torchbearer in the relay to the Summer Olympics in Berlin in 1936.
 Werner Sollors (1943- ), U.S. scholar of English literature and African-American studies

Honorary citizens
 1895 Adolf Schreyer (1828–1899)
 1902 Karl Wilhelm von Meister (1863–1935)
 1933 Paul von Hindenburg (1847–1934)

Twin cities

 Le Lavandou, France, since September 2, 1972
 Ballenstedt, Germany, since October 6, 1988
 Porto Recanati, Italy, since September 5, 1993
 Aberystwyth, Wales, United Kingdom, since November 1, 1997
 Zaventem, Belgium
 Esquel, Argentina
 Marchena, Spain
Kronberg im Taunus has also a friendship with:
 Guldental, Germany

References

External links

  
 Kronberg Castle
 
 
 Heraldry of the Cronburg family
 
 Taunus Zeitung (newspaper)
 Kronberger Bote (newspaper)
 Opel-Zoo website

Kronberg im Taunus